Ménder García Torres (born 28 October 1998) is a Colombian footballer who currently plays as a forward for Minnesota United.

Career statistics

Club

Notes

References

1998 births
Living people
Colombian footballers
Association football forwards
Once Caldas footballers
Categoría Primera A players
Minnesota United FC players
Designated Players (MLS)
Major League Soccer players